Tremelo is a municipality located in the Belgian province of Flemish Brabant, in Flanders. The municipality comprises the towns of Baal and Tremelo proper. On January 1, 2006, Tremelo had a total population of 13,725. The total area is 21.57 km² (5330 acres) which gives a population density of 636 inhabitants per km² (1647 per sq. mi.).

Located in the arrondissement or administrative district of Leuven, the official language is Dutch.  Tremelo is most famous for having been the hometown of Father Damien, SS.CC. whom Pope Benedict XVI canonized on October 11, 2009, as Saint Damien of Molokai. Father Damien is locally known as Pater Damiaan, and was a legendary martyr of charity who had tended to the lepers in the Hawaiian Islands.

References

External links
 
Official website - Only available in Dutch

Municipalities of Flemish Brabant